Kejvi Bardhi (born 7 August 1996 in Laç) is an Albanian football player who currently plays for KF Laçi in the Albanian Superliga.

Controversies
In October 2016, Bardhi was arrested after he was accused of causing a collision of three cars including a police car on a crossroads between Laç and Fushë Krujë. Bardhi was reportedly driving too fast and the accident left three people injured. In 2017, he allegedly posted a picture of himself on social media while driving a car with a gun on his lap.

Personal life
Kejvi is a son of Kurbin mayor Arthur Bardhi.

References

1996 births
Living people
People from Laç
Association football forwards
Albanian footballers
KF Laçi players
KF Elbasani players
Kategoria Superiore players